Eulepidotis ilyrias is a moth of the family Erebidae first described by Pieter Cramer in 1776. It is found in French Guiana.

References

Moths described in 1776
ilyrias
Taxa named by Pieter Cramer